Liocyma is a genus of molluscs in the family Veneridae.

Species
 Liocyma fluctuosa (Gould, 1841) – wavy clam

References

Veneridae
Bivalve genera